Redemption 87 was an East Bay hardcore punk band containing ex-members of Unit Pride, Skankin' Pickle, and Token Entry. It also included future members of AFI and the Nerve Agents.

Their goal was to reclaim "hardcore" from the crossover heavy metal music it had become and return it to its punk roots. They were heavily influenced by New York hardcore bands including Youth of Today, Sick of It All, Warzone, and Gorilla Biscuits.

In 1995 they released their first EP, The Spidey Sessions, which contained four songs. Some of these songs were also included in their 13-song first album in 1997, which was self-titled. They released their last album, All Guns Poolside, in 1999, which contained 13 songs, three of which were covers of songs by Cro-mags, Negative Approach and Bad Brains.

In 1999, the band dissolved and Jade Puget joined AFI, while Eric Ozenne formed The Nerve Agents.

External links

Hardcore punk groups from California